This article lists monuments and sites of historic importance in Odisha, India.

Prehistoric

Ancient

Singhapura (In Jajpur Dist): Some historians said that it was the capital of Singha Bahu, a Kalinga King who was contemporary of Lord Buddh and Bimbisar of Rajgrih. His exiled son Prince Vijaya established Sinhalese dynasty in Sri Lanka. The Archaeological Survey of India has been requested to excavate this site to unravel the truth.

Medieval

Colonial

See also
 History of Odisha

References

History of Odisha
Lists of tourist attractions in Odisha
Archaeological sites in Odisha